Kings Island (formerly Bra's Island) is an island in the Old River in the south Sacramento-San Joaquin River Delta in San Joaquin County, California,  southwest of Stockton. The small  island is the smallest of a cluster of delta islands including Eucalyptus Island, Widdows Island, Victoria Island, and Coney Island, adjacent to Clifton Court Forebay. It appears on a 1978 United States Geological Survey map of the area.

See also
List of islands of California

References

External links
 Kings Island Community website

Islands of the Sacramento–San Joaquin River Delta
Islands of Northern California
Islands of San Joaquin County, California
Islands of California